Alexandr Sinicyn (born 27 March 1996) is a Czech former competitive ice dancer. He and his skating partner, Nicole Kuzmichová, qualified for the free dance at the 2016 and 2017 World Junior Championships.

Personal life 
Alexandr Sinicyn was born on 27 March 1996 in Prague, Czech Republic. He is the son of Natalia Karamysheva and Rostislav Sinicyn, who competed together in ice dancing for the Soviet Union.

Career

Early career 
Sinicyn began learning to skate in 2000. He competed in novice ice dancing with Jiřina Geyerová in the 2007–08 season and with Jana Bryndová during the next two seasons.

In the 2010–11 season, Sinicyn began appearing on the junior level  with Jana Čejková. The two placed 16th at the 2010–11 Junior Grand Prix (JGP) event in Graz, Austria; 7th at the 2012 Winter Youth Olympics in Innsbruck, Austria; and 8th at the 2012–13 JGP in Chemnitz, Germany. They were coached by Natalia Karamysheva and Rostislav Sinicyn in Prague and Oberstdorf.

Partnership with Kuzmich 
In the spring of 2014, Sinicyn teamed up with Canada's Nicole Kuzmich to compete for the Czech Republic. Their international debut came in October 2014 on the Junior Grand Prix (JGP) series; they finished 9th at both of their JGP assignments, in Dresden, Germany, and Zagreb, Croatia. At the 2015 World Junior Championships in Tallinn, Estonia, their short dance placement, 22nd, was not enough to qualify for the final segment. They were coached by Carol Lane, Juris Razgulajevs, Jon Lane, and Natalia Karamysheva in Toronto and Oberstdorf.

Kuzmichová/Sinicyn placed 7th at both of their 2015–16 JGP events, in Bratislava, Slovakia, and Linz, Austria. In March 2016, they competed in Debrecen, Hungary, at their second World Junior Championships. The two placed 14th in the first segment and qualified for the free dance, where they placed 10th, lifting them to 11th overall. 

Competing in the 2016–17 JGP series, Kuzmichová/Sinicyn placed fourth in Saint-Gervais-les-Bains, France, and won the silver medal in Ostrava, Czech Republic.

Programs

With Kuzmich

With Čejková

Competitive highlights 
GP: Grand Prix; CS: Challenger Series; JGP: Junior Grand Prix

With Kuzmichová

With Čejková

With Geyerová and Bryndová

References

External links 
 

1996 births
Czech male ice dancers
Czech people of Russian descent
Living people
Figure skaters from Prague
Figure skaters at the 2012 Winter Youth Olympics
Competitors at the 2017 Winter Universiade